Civilian Conservation Corps Camp in Kokeʻe State Park is located at Hawaii Route 550, in Waimea, on the island of Kauai,  in the U.S. state of Hawaii. It was built in 1935 with lumber that was put into the saltwater and floated to the shore at Port Allen, the seawater adding a natural termite protection to the lumber. The camp was in continual use for forest management, until Hurricane Iwa devastated it in 1982.  In the 1990s it was restored through the efforts of the non-profit Hui O Laka environmental group, and is currently open to the public. It was added to the Hawaiʻi Register of Historic Places and the National Register of Historic Places on December 20, 1996.

History
The camp was originally built in 1935 as one of five Hawaii camps constructed by the Civilian Conservation Corps of Franklin Roosevelt's New Deal stimulus. The other four camps have been absorbed by population growth, and Koke'e is the lone camp remaining in a natural environment. The CCC at Koke'e provided forest management, by building trails, roads, and fences, as well as planting over a million trees on Kauai. They helped fight forest fires, eradicate unwanted feral mammals, and collected tree seeds. In addition, the CCC from Koke'e also built the CCC camp at Waialae Cabin.  In 1943, the program had been disbanded, and the camp was used by the 443d Airlift Wing during World War II. From 1966 until 1973, the Job Corps occupied the premises and provided forest management, followed by the Youth Conservation Corps. The camp was abandoned in 1982 after Hurricane Iwa.

The camp is operated by the non-profit local environmental group Hui O Laka, which is dedicated to educating, enhancing, and maintaining Koke'e. In 1990, the Hawaii State Legislature provided Hui O Laka a $20,000 Grant-in-Aid for renovations to the camp. The restoration and continual maintenance of the camp has been provided by members of Hui O Laka, and by volunteers.

There are seventeen contributing, and three non-contributing buildings, sites, and structures on the site. During construction, the lumber could not be lifted directly onto the shore, because of the shallowness of Port Allen and the lack of equipment to accomplish the task.  Instead, the lumber was floated ashore in the salt water. The soaking in seawater gave the lumber lasting termite protection, allowing the wood to be virtually intact when the camp was added to the NRHP in 1996. The non-contributing buildings were built after 1950.

Contributing buildings
Executive building  (in use for overnight accommodations)
Camp administration building  (in use as the Natural History Museum)
Mess hall 
"A" Barracks 
"B" Barracks 
"C" Barracks
Recreation lodge  destroyed in 1982 by Hurricane Iwa
Foremen cabin 
Building 9, storage 
Supply room  
Cooler room  
Gas house, formerly used as a garage
Building 14, small wooden building
Building 15, cook's house demolished in 1993
Building 16, formerly a garage and workshop
Ranger's cabin     built in 1930
Building "I"  old laundry room

Facilities, fees
Reservations are required  for overnight accommodations at the camp. Stays are limited primarily to Hui O Laka volunteers and researchers with an advance payment of rental fee.  The facilities are sometimes available for large group functions, subject to advance approval.

See also
Koke'e State Park

References

External links
Kokee Museum Home Page

National Register of Historic Places in Kauai County, Hawaii
Tourist attractions in Kauai County, Hawaii
Civilian Conservation Corps in Hawaii
Protected areas established in 1935
1935 establishments in Hawaii
Hawaii Register of Historic Places
Protected areas of Kauai